The secretary of trade and industry (Filipino: Kalihim ng Kalakalan at Industriya) is the head of the Department of Trade and Industry and is a member of the president’s Cabinet.

The current secretary is Alfredo E. Pascual, who assumed office on June 30, 2022.

List of secretaries of trade and industry

References

External links
DTI official website

 
Philippines
Philippines
Trade and Industry